Mahanth Shyam Sunder Das  is an Indian politician. He was elected to the lower House of the Indian Parliament the Lok Sabha from Sitamarhi, Bihar as a member of the Janata Party.

References

External links
Official biographical sketch in Parliament of India website

Janata Party politicians
1932 births
India MPs 1977–1979
Lok Sabha members from Bihar
Possibly living people